Mohammad Reza Soukhtehsaraei (born 31 January 1950) is a retired Iranian super-heavyweight wrestler who competed both in freestyle and Greco-Roman divisions. He was a three-time flag bearer and gold medalist at the 1982, 1986 and 1990 Asian Games. He also won silver medals at the world championships in 1978 and 1981.

References

1950 births
Wrestlers at the 1976 Summer Olympics
Iranian male sport wrestlers
Living people
Asian Games gold medalists for Iran
Asian Games silver medalists for Iran
Asian Games medalists in wrestling
Pahlevans of Iran
Wrestlers at the 1974 Asian Games
Wrestlers at the 1982 Asian Games
Wrestlers at the 1986 Asian Games
Wrestlers at the 1990 Asian Games
World Wrestling Championships medalists

Medalists at the 1974 Asian Games
Medalists at the 1982 Asian Games
Medalists at the 1986 Asian Games
Medalists at the 1990 Asian Games
Olympic wrestlers of Iran
Asian Wrestling Championships medalists